Cane Broome (born November 29, 1994) is an American professional basketball player for the St. John's Edge of the National Basketball League of Canada. He played college basketball for the Sacred Heart Pioneers and the Cincinnati Bearcats.

College career
He was named Northeast Conference Player of the Week three times as a sophomore. On February 20, 2016, he became the only player since the 2010–11 season score at least 39 points, post six rebounds and six assists without turning the ball over. Broome was named Northeast Conference Men's Basketball Player of the Year in his sophomore season at Sacred Heart, just the second sophomore to do so. On the season, he averaged 23.1 points and 4.9 rebounds per game. Broome announced in April 2016 that he would transfer to Cincinnati and sit out a season. It was an adjustment, as Broome was used to being the star player and became a role player. As a junior, he scored in double figures seven times and considers his 16-point, five-assist performance in a loss to Xavier on December 2 his best game. Broome averaged 7.9 points per game as a junior on a 31–5 Cincinnati team that earned a 2 seed in the NCAA Tournament. As a senior, he averaged 8.3 points and 2.2 assists per game.

Professional career
Broome signed with the St. John's Edge of the National Basketball League of Canada on October 11, 2019. On February 18, 2020, Broome was named National Basketball League of Canada player of the week after averaging 22.5 points per game in two victories. He averaged 13.9 points and 2.1 rebounds per game, earning league All-Rookie Team honors.

Career statistics

College

|-
| style="text-align:left;"| 2014–15
| style="text-align:left;"| Sacred Heart
| 32 || 30 || 31.6 || .445 || .338 || .752 || 3.8 || 2.4 || 1.1 || .2 || 14.5
|-
| style="text-align:left;"| 2015–16
| style="text-align:left;"| Sacred Heart
| 30 || 30 || 37.5 || .445 || .311 || .768 || 4.9 || 2.9 || 1.7 || .0 || 23.1
|-
| style="text-align:left;"| 2016–17
| style="text-align:left;"| Cincinnati
| style="text-align:center;" colspan="11"|  Redshirt
|-
| style="text-align:left;"| 2017–18
| style="text-align:left;"| Cincinnati
| 34 || 3 || 20.5 || .463 || .390 || .708 || 1.5 || 2.8 || .9 || .1 || 7.9
|-
| style="text-align:left;"| 2018–19
| style="text-align:left;"| Cincinnati
| 35 || 4 || 21.2 || .396 || .287 || .750 || 1.7 || 2.2 || .6 || .0 || 8.3
|- class="sortbottom"
| style="text-align:center;" colspan="2"| Career
| 131 || 67 || 27.3 || .439 || .326 || .753 || 2.9 || 2.6 || 1.1 || .1 || 13.1

References

External links
Cincinnati Bearcats bio
Sacred Heart Pioneers bio

1994 births
Living people
American men's basketball players
Basketball players from Hartford, Connecticut
Cincinnati Bearcats men's basketball players
Point guards
Sacred Heart Pioneers men's basketball players